Daniel Hayward (1807 – 29 May 1852) was an English professional cricketer who played first-class cricket from 1832 to 1851. He was the father of Cambridge batsmen Thomas Hayward and Daniel Hayward junior; and the grandfather of Tom Hayward, the Surrey and England opener.

A right-handed batsman and wicket-keeper who was mainly associated with Cambridge Town Club, Hayward made 24 known appearances in first-class matches. He represented the Players in the Gentlemen v Players series and the North in the North v. South series.

He is buried in the Mill Road cemetery, Cambridge, as is his son Thomas Hayward.

References

Bibliography
 

1807 births
1852 deaths
English cricketers
English cricketers of 1826 to 1863
Cambridge Town Club cricketers
Players cricketers
North v South cricketers
Surrey cricketers
Marylebone Cricket Club cricketers
United South of England Eleven cricketers
Cambridgeshire and Yorkshire cricketers